Leonardo "Léo" Silva Lelis (born 15 November 1993) is a Brazilian professional footballer who plays as a centre-back for Indonesian club Persebaya Surabaya.

Club career

Persiraja Banda Aceh
In June 2021, Léo Lelis moved to Persiraja Banda Aceh in the Indonesian Liga 1. He made his professional debut for the club, in a 2–1 loss against Bhayangkara on 29 August 2021.

On 11 September 2021, he scored his first goal for Persiraja in a 3–2 win over PSS Sleman, where he scored with a header in the 5th minute.

He contributed with total 29 appearances and 2 goals during with Persiraja Banda Aceh for one season.

Persebaya Surabaya
Lelis was signed for Persebaya Surabaya to play in Liga 1 in the 2022–23 season. He made his league debut on 14 August 2022 in a match against Madura United at the Gelora Bung Tomo Stadium, Surabaya. On 1 October, Lelis scored his first league goal for Persebaya in a away win against Arema at the Kanjuruhan Stadium. Until the end of the match, the score was 2–3 for Persebaya over Arema, but after the match ended, a tragedy appeared called Kanjuruhan Stadium disaster, where the home fans rioted to the point of killing hundreds of victims. On 6 December, Lelis scored a brace for Persebaya in a 2–3 win against PS Barito Putera in the 12nd season of Liga 1.

References

External links
 

1993 births
Living people
Sportspeople from São Paulo (state)
Brazilian footballers
Brazilian expatriate footballers
Fehérvár FC players
Paulista Futebol Clube players
FC Kamza players
Valmieras FK players
Persiraja Banda Aceh players
Persebaya Surabaya players
Nemzeti Bajnokság I players
Kategoria e Parë players
Kategoria Superiore players
Latvian Higher League players
Liga 1 (Indonesia) players
Brazilian expatriate sportspeople in Hungary
Brazilian expatriate sportspeople in Albania
Brazilian expatriate sportspeople in Latvia
Brazilian expatriate sportspeople in Indonesia
Expatriate footballers in Hungary
Expatriate footballers in Albania
Expatriate footballers in Latvia
Expatriate footballers in Indonesia
Association football central defenders